Channel Island milk is a creamy, light-beige coloured cow's milk from the Jersey cattle and Guernsey cattle breeds. As well as in the Channel Islands, Channel Island milk is produced in the United Kingdom, Australia, South Africa, Denmark, the United States and Canada.

Channel Island milk has a higher fat (5.4 per cent) and protein (3.9 per cent) content than whole milk produced by Holstein Friesian cattle (3.9 per cent and 3.3 per cent respectively), and also contains higher levels of calcium, vitamin A and vitamin D than other types of milk. Milk from Guernsey cows is notable for the levels of beta-carotene, Omega-3 fatty acid and A2 β-casein protein.

The Guernsey and Jersey dairies each have a monopoly on milk supplies on their respective islands, and both distribute a range of full fat, semi-skimmed and skimmed milk from the local pedigree herds. In the UK, Channel Island milk and dairy products are often targeted at the premium end of the market; the UK retail market for Channel Island milk products is more limited than that in Canada and Denmark, where a wider array of yoghurts, cheeses, cream cheeses and ice creams made from Channel Island milk, in full fat and low fat forms, are sometimes available. Channel Island milk can be known as gold top milk from the color of the bottle cap commonly used to distinguish it.

References

Milk
British drinks
Danish drinks
American drinks
Canadian drinks
Australian drinks
South African drinks
Dairy farming in the United Kingdom
Milk